Fremont Lake is a lake in Murray County, in the U.S. state of Minnesota.

Fremont Lake was named for John C. Frémont (1813–1890), an explorer of the area.

See also
List of lakes in Minnesota

References

Lakes of Minnesota
Lakes of Murray County, Minnesota